Al-Arabi Reserves (Arabic: رديف النادي العربي), is the second team of Al Arabi Sports Club. Al Arabi Reserves Team consists of the same squad as the Qatargas league clubs who have another team Qatar Star League (QSL). They are active in football, basketball, handball, volleyball, futsal and reserves.

Stadium

Honors
Reserve League

 Winners (1): 2009/2010

Professionalism
QSL clubs are limited to 4 foreign professionals (3 + 1 Asian) per squad.

References

Reserves